Macrognathus is a genus of eel-like fish of the family Mastacembelidae of the order Synbranchiformes.

These fish are distributed throughout most of South and Southeast Asia. Macrognathus species feed on small aquatic insect larvae as well as oligochaetes.

Appearance and anatomy

Macrognathus are mostly similar to Mastacembelus. However, they differ in a more modified rostrum, which may be slightly to significantly larger and longer than those found in Mastacembelus. This serves not only to find food but also to help gather food.

In the aquarium
A number of species of this genus are popular aquarium fish. These include the lesser spiny eel, Macrognathus aculeatus, the spotfinned spiny eel, Macrognathus siamensis, as well as others.

Species
According to FishBase, there are currently 25 recognized species in this genus. According to Catalog of Fishes, one of these, M. malabaricus, belongs in the genus Mastacembelus instead of Macrognathus and another, M. taeniagaster, is considered a junior synonym of M. circumcinctus.

 Macrognathus aculeatus (Bloch, 1786) (Lesser spiny eel)
 Macrognathus albus 
 Macrognathus aral (Bloch & J. G. Schneider, 1801) (Onestripe spiny eel)
 Macrognathus aureus Britz, 2010
 Macrognathus caudiocellatus (Boulenger, 1893)
 Macrognathus circumcinctus (Hora, 1924)
 Macrognathus dorsiocellatus Britz, 2010
 Macrognathus fasciatus Plamoottil & Abraham, 2014
 Macrognathus guentheri (F. Day, 1865) (Malabar spiny eel)
 Macrognathus keithi (Herre, 1940)
 Macrognathus lineatomaculatus Britz, 2010
 Macrognathus maculatus (G. Cuvier, 1832) (Frecklefin eel)
 Macrognathus malabaricus (Jerdon, 1849)
 Macrognathus meklongensis T. R. Roberts, 1986
 Macrognathus morehensis Arunkumar & Tombi Singh, 2000
 Macrognathus obscurus Britz, 2010
 Macrognathus pancalus F. Hamilton, 1822 (Barred spiny eel)
 Macrognathus pavo Britz, 2010
 Macrognathus pentophthalmos (Gronow, 1854) (extinct?)
 Macrognathus semiocellatus T. R. Roberts, 1986
 Macrognathus siamensis (Günther, 1861) (Peacock eel)
 Macrognathus siangensis Arunkumar, 2016
 Macrognathus taeniagaster (Fowler, 1935)
 Macrognathus tapirus Kottelat & Widjanarti, 2005
 Macrognathus zebrinus (Blyth, 1858) (Zebra spiny eel)

References

 
Mastacembelidae
Fish of Southeast Asia